The Beach may refer to:

Media 
The Beach (novel), a 1996 novel by Alex Garland
The Beach (film), a 2000 movie based on the novel
The Beach (TV series), a 2020 Australian lifestyle television shown on SBS and NITV
The Beach (UK radio station), a British commercial local radio station in Great Yarmouth, Norfolk
CHWC-FM, a radio station in Goderich, Ontario, Canada, that identifies as "The Beach"
"The Beach" (song), a 2003 song by the duo Miss Kittin & The Hacker
"The Beach", an alternate version of the song "Blue Monday" from the band New Order.
"The Beach" (Avatar: The Last Airbender), an Avatar: The Last Airbender season 3 episode
"The Beach", an episode of the television series Teletubbies
"The Beach" (Bluey), an episode of the cartoon Bluey
"The Beach" (Bluey book), a printed book version of the episode

Places 
The Beach (waterpark), a former water park in Albuquerque, New Mexico
The Beach at Adventure Landing, a water park in Mason, Ohio
The Beaches, a neighbourhood of Toronto, Ontario, Canada, also commonly known as "The Beach"
California State University, Long Beach, often colloquially referred to as "The Beach"
 The Long Beach State athletic program, officially branded as "The Beach" since 2020–21

See also
 Beach
 Beach (disambiguation)